Carex zunyiensis is a plant species of the genus Carex and the family Cyperaceae

Description 
It is described as having short woody rhizomes. with very short leaves that are about  25 to 70 centimeters long.

Taxonomy 
It was described by Tsin Tang & Fa Tsuan Wang. In: Acta Phytotax. Sin. 24: 241. in 1986.

References 

zunyiensis